On 15 August 2016, two separate bus crashes in Nepal led to the deaths of several people; dozens more were injured. There was speculation in the aftermath of the accidents, that miscommunication regarding the availability of government grants may have led to overcrowding on one of the buses. Days of rainfall preceded the accidents.

First incident
Many were survivors of the Nepalese earthquakes of April 2015 and May 2015. Some of them were returning to their village to collect government grants to rebuild their destroyed homes that they mistakenly thought were going to be paid there. Others mistakenly thought they had only a few days left before a deadline to return to their village to sign papers to receive the grants. Overcrowding on Nepalese buses is common; as the bus travelled along its route more people boarded until many were seated on the roof and in the aisle. It was reported that almost 90 people were on the 35-seat bus. Some people survived by jumping off the roof before the bus fell. 27 to 33 people were killed and 38 to 42 were injured. The driver of the bus survived and was found in a tree.

An investigation was launched to see why the driver lost control and whether the brakes failed.

Second incident
The second incident occurred near Siddheshwar in Baitadi District, in far-western Nepal. At about 3:30p.m. on 15 August, another bus slipped off of a high mountain road, falling  and killing three or four people and injuring thirty.

References

Nepal bus crashes
Bus incidents in Nepal
Nepal bus crashes
Kavrepalanchok District
Baitadi District
August 2016 events in Asia
2016 disasters in Nepal